Euchromius geminus is a species of moth in the family Crambidae. It is found in Kenya.

The length of the forewings is about 14.5 mm. The groundcolour of the forewings is creamy white, densely suffused with ochreous to dark brown scales. The hindwings are creamy white to light brown with a darkly bordered termen. Adults have been recorded in May.

References

Moths described in 1988
Crambinae
Moths of Africa